Sri Parasakthi College for Women located in Coutrallam, is an autonomous women's college affiliated to the Manonmaniam Sundaranar University of Tirunelveli district, Tamil Nadu, India. It was founded in 1964 by Late Thiru A.R.Subbiah Mudaliar (Former MLA and educational reformist) on  20 acres of land donated magnanimously by His Highness the Late Maharaja of Travancore. Sri Chithirai Thirunal Balaramavarma. The first principal was Principal Miss.S.Baghirathi, M.A., M.Litt. 

The college comes under the control of Hindu Religious and Charitable Endowment Board of Tamil Nadu, with the Commissioner, H.R.& C.E. Department as the President of the College Committee. The college was conferred autonomy in 1978, the only and first rural women's college to be conferred autonomous status in the whole of India. 

The institute provides undergraduate, postgraduate and research programmes in arts and science fields.

External links
http://www.sriparasakthicollege.com
http://www.collegesintamilnadu.com/District_Wise/tirunelveli.htm

Articles lacking sources from March 2009
Women's universities and colleges in Tamil Nadu
Education in Tirunelveli district
Educational institutions established in 1964
1964 establishments in Madras State
Colleges affiliated to Manonmaniam Sundaranar University
Universities and colleges in Tirunelveli district